Marek Kaleta (born 17 December 1961 in Kunda) is a retired Estonian male javelin thrower who represented the Soviet Union in the 1980s and later on Estonia. He set his personal best 83.30, which was the Estonian national record this time, on 12 August 1990 in Pieksämäki, Finland.  Kaleta is best known for winning the gold medal in the men's javelin throw event at the 1987 Summer Universiade in Zagreb.

Achievements

References

1961 births
Living people
Soviet male javelin throwers
Estonian male javelin throwers
World Athletics Championships athletes for the Soviet Union
World Athletics Championships athletes for Estonia
Universiade medalists in athletics (track and field)
People from Kunda, Estonia
Universiade gold medalists for the Soviet Union
Medalists at the 1987 Summer Universiade
Competitors at the 1990 Goodwill Games